Bachdjarah - Tennis is a transfer station serving the Line 1 of the Algiers Metro.

Etymology
The Bachdjarah resort - Tennis is between the cities' Maarifa Mohamed Lazhar (488 LGTS)  and  Bachdjarah 3 '' in the common eponym, approxilité Tennis Club Bachdjerrah.

The four outputs of the station are located on either side of the street between the two cities. One of them overlooks the large boulevard that separates the towns of Bachdjerrah and Bourouba.

It is equipped with a lift for disabled people.

During the construction of the extension line of the Algiers metro, the largest club of Algiers Tennis and nobr 16 courts, located within 200m station had been halved to dig a trench between 2009 and 2011 before being rebuilt.

References

External links
 Algiers Metro Site
 Ligne 1 Algiers Metro on Structurae

Algiers Metro stations
Railway stations opened in 2015
2015 establishments in Algeria
Railway stations in Algeria opened in the 21st century